David Zimmer (born April 7, 1944) is a former politician in Ontario, Canada. He was the Liberal member of the Legislative Assembly of Ontario for Willowdale from 2003 to 2018. He was a member of cabinet in the government of Kathleen Wynne. He was the longest serving minister of aboriginal/indigenous affairs in Ontario history to date.

Background
Zimmer was born in Kitchener, Ontario. He attended University of Ottawa Law School and was called to the Bar of Ontario. He first sought elected office as an alderman in Kitchener in the 1970s but was not successful. While living in Kitchener, he was active in the Progressive Conservative Party. When the Kitchener—Wilmot provincial electoral district was created in 1975, Zimmer served as the founding president of the local PC riding association, and managed the 1981 campaign for the local PC candidate Alan Barron. He left the PC Party and joined the Liberals in 1985 , citing disenchantment with both federal leader Brian Mulroney and provincial leader Frank Miller.

Zimmer served several prominent legal functions in both the federal and provincial Liberal parties prior to his election. He was legal counsel for Maurizio Bevilacqua in the two year saga following his 1988 election, where the close results were extensively contested in court and was eventually voided by the Ontario Supreme Court. He also chaired the federal party's permanent appeal committee, overseeing numerous appeals during the 1990 leadership contest and from nomination contests prior to the party's victory in 1993.

From 1982 to 1984 Zimmer was Director of the Humane Society and from 1993 to 1995 was President of the Alzheimer Society of Canada. He also served as an administrative law instructor in the Law Society's Bar Admission Course.

In 1994, Zimmer was appointed by the federal government to the Immigration and Refugee Board of Canada as its assistant deputy chairman heading the Toronto office, and was shortlisted for the national chairmanship in 1999.  In 2001, he was appointed chairperson of Toronto's public housing provider, the  Toronto Community Housing Corporation.

Provincial politics
In the 2003 Ontario provincial election, Zimmer ran as the Liberal candidate in the riding of Willowdale, defeating Progressive Conservative incumbent and sitting Minister of Municipal Affairs David Young by 1,866 votes. The contest, billed in the press as "the battle of the Davids", was considered a key race to watch given Young's profile as a possible future PC leader and Willowdale's long history of being represented by prominent PC ministers. Willowdale was where the PC came the closest to retaining a seat within the City of Toronto in 2003. Zimmer fended off a challenge by high profile local councillor David Shiner in 2007, and was re-elected again 2011, and 2014, increasing his share of vote and margin of victory each time.

Between 2003 and 2011, Zimmer served as Parliamentary Assistant to Attorneys General Michael Bryant and Chris Bentley. Between 2011 and 2013, Zimmer served as Parliamentary Assistant to Kathleen Wynne, then Minister of Municipal Affairs and Housing and Minister of Aboriginal Affairs. He was a member of the Standing Committee on Public Accounts (2003–06, 2007–11, 2012), Standing Committee on Estimates (2006–07), Standing Committee on Justice Policy (2006–11), Standing Committee on General Government (2012), Select Committee on Elections (2008–09), and Select Committee on the proposed transaction of the TMX Group and the London Stock Exchange Group (2011).

In 2004, his motion to create an "Elder Abuse Awareness Day" was passed with support from all parties. He also assisted former Ontario Attorney General Michael Bryant with legislation to ban pit bulls in Ontario. In 2006, he sponsored a Private Member’s Bill which will suspend the driver’s license of anyone who is convicted of impaired boating. It passed with unanimous consent of all parties in the Ontario Legislature.

Zimmer was awarded the Greatest Local Hero Award by the North York Town Crier for his volunteer and community work in Willowdale. In 2005, he received a "Social Work Doctors’ Colloquium" Award of Merit for his work toward a just and caring society. He has also been cited for work on Ontario Municipal Board reform and the new City of Toronto Act, which gives Toronto greater power to manage its own affairs.

During Ontario Liberal Party's 2012-13 leadership election, Zimmer along with Linda Jeffrey, Reza Moridi and Mario Sergio, were the first four caucus supporters of Kathleen Wynne's candidacy, declaring their support at Wynne's campaign launch on November 5, 2012.

Minister of Aboriginal Affairs
In February 2013, Zimmer, who was Premier Kathleen Wynne's parliamentary assistant in the Ministry of Aboriginal Affairs and one of her earliest caucus supporters, was appointed by Wynne to her cabinet to succeed herself as the Minister of Aboriginal Affairs. Under Zimmer's watch, the aboriginal affairs ministry was able to secure significant, in some case unprecedented, progress on many files, in large part due to the Wynne's personal interest and support in the portfolio and her personal affinity with Zimmer. He oversaw Ontario's Response to the Truth and Reconciliation Commission, including a $250 million investment on a suite of education, health, cultural and social services programs focused on reconciliation and addressing the legacy and negative impacts of residential schools. As part of Ontario's response, in June 2016, his ministerial title was renamed to Minister of Indigenous Relations and Reconciliation.

Zimmer is the longest serving minister for indigenous affairs in Ontario history to date, and was only one of two ministers who serve no other ministerial role while minister. During his tenure, he placed specific focus on the indigenous relationship aspect of his role. He was determined to personally visited as many of Ontario's First Nation Communities as possible, including remote reserves in extremely poor conditions that are difficult to reach. By the end of his tenure, he personally visited 129 of Ontario's 133 First Nations.

In the 2018 provincial election, when the Liberal Party suffered its worst result in the party's 161-year history, Zimmer was defeated locally in Willowdale by Progressive Conservative candidate Stan Cho.

Electoral record

References

Notes

Citations

External links

1944 births
21st-century Canadian politicians
Immigration and Refugee Board of Canada
Living people
Members of the Executive Council of Ontario
Ontario Liberal Party MPPs
Politicians from Kitchener, Ontario